Mudra is a 1989 Indian Malayalam film, directed by Sibi Malayil, starring Mammootty and Madhu in the lead roles.

Plot

The story revolves around a government youth detention center where juvenile delinquents are rehabilitated. Ramabhadran takes charge as supervisor and he tries to change the practices by letting inmates roam free without lock up and promoting talents of kids. A section of the kids become followers of Ramabhadran while a few don't trust him. Warden Pathros used to let a few kids to go out of the jail and indulge in theft of vehicles for Paul, a vehicle thief and goon and in return they receive money and ganja. The kids who are let out will come before morning so as to avoid being caught. Ramabhadran caught a few kids smoking ganja and beats them up. That night the kids who went out could not come back in time due to a car breakdown and it creates a havoc in the jail. One of the inmate Vinayan was found dead and Pathros tries to put the blame on Ramabhadran. However, Ramabhadran manages to prove his innocence by catching the culprits and leave the children's home forever. All the inmates  bid adieu to Ramabhadran with claps to acknowledge his heartiest efforts.

Cast

Mammootty as Ramabhadran
 Madhu as IG Gopalan Kurup
 Mukesh as Sasi
 Baiju as Vinayan
 Captain Raju as Paul
 Mahesh as Babu
 Sukumaran as Sugunan
 C. I. Paul
 Karamana Janardanan Nair as Pathrose
 Kuthiravattam Pappu
 Mala Aravindan
Mamukkoya as Mamu
 Paravoor Bharathan as Superintendent Bhaskaran Menon
 Parvathy as Radhika, Vinayan's Sister
 Shivaji as Kannan, Police officer
Augustine as Alex, Paul's gang member
 Radhamani
Santhakumari as Lathika, Vinayan's mother
 Sudheesh as Unni

Soundtrack 

There were only two songs, composed by Mohan Sitara, with lyrics by Kaithapram Damoradan Namboothiri. Background score was by Johnson.

References

External links
 

1989 films
1980s Malayalam-language films
Indian prison films
Fictional portrayals of the Kerala Police
Films directed by Sibi Malayil
Films scored by Mohan Sithara